Tinik sa Dibdib (International title: Damage / ) is a Philippine television drama series broadcast by GMA Network. Based on a 1985 Philippine film of the same title, the series is the seventeenth installment of Sine Novela. Directed by Gil Tejada Jr., it stars Sunshine Dizon, Nadine Samonte and Marvin Agustin. It premiered on September 28, 2009 on the network's Dramarama sa Hapon line up replacing Kung Aagawin Mo ang Lahat sa Akin. The series concluded on January 22, 2010 with a total of 85 episodes. It was replaced with Ina, Kasusuklaman Ba Kita? in its timeslot.

Cast and characters

Lead cast
 Sunshine Dizon and Nadine Samonte as Lorna Yadao-Domingo / Danica
 Marvin Agustin as Rolando "Lando" Domingo

Supporting cast
 Sheryl Cruz as Rita Domingo
 Ara Mina as Trixie Domingo
 Michelle Madrigal as Moret Yadao / Corazon Domingo
 Bembol Roco as  Tiburcio "Tibo" Yadao 
 Daria Ramirez as Candida "Diday" Yadao 
 Andrea del Rosario as Divine
 Carlo Aquino as Ruden
 Jenny Miller as Nini Reyes
 Tiya Pusit as Manda
 Marco Alcaraz as Paolo Ramirez
 Maybelyn dela Cruz as Choleng
 Jen Rosendahl as Lucy
 Miguel Tanfelix as Boyito Domingo

Guest cast
 Anita Linda as Luisa
 Rico Barrera as Victor
 Deborah Sun as Emily Tupaz
 Sandy Reyes as young Angelita Domingo

Ratings
According to AGB Nielsen Philippines' Mega Manila household television ratings, the pilot episode of Tinik sa Dibdib earned a 7.4% rating. While the final episode scored a 17.5% rating.

References

External links
 

2009 Philippine television series debuts
2010 Philippine television series endings
Filipino-language television shows
GMA Network drama series
Live action television shows based on films
Television shows set in the Philippines